The zinc 5 Reichspfennig coin was minted by Nazi Germany between 1940 and 1944 during World War II, replacing the bronze-aluminum version, which had a distinct golden color. It was worth 1/20 or .05 of a Reichsmark, the same ratio of a modern day five-cent piece (nickel) to one USD. Made entirely of zinc, the 5 Reichspfennig is an emergency issue type, similar to the zinc 1 and 10 Reichspfennigs, and the aluminum 50 Reichspfennig coins from the same period.

Mint marks

Mintage

1940

1941

1942

1943

1944

References

Modern obsolete currencies
Currencies of Europe
Currencies of Germany
Zinc and aluminum coins minted in Germany and occupied territories during World War II
Five-cent coins